Masjid Al-Abrar (Malay for Al-Abrar Mosque; Jawi:مسجد الأبرار) is a mosque located along Telok Ayer Street in Chinatown within the Central Area, Singapore. It is one of the earliest mosques in Singapore.

The building was gazetted as a national monument on 19 November 1974.

History

The early Tamil immigrants first established the Masjid Al-Abrar in 1827 with a makeshift thatched hut that they used for worship until it was replaced by a brick building between 1850 and 1855.

Between 1986 and 1989, major renovations were carried out, and the capacity was expanded to allow up to 800 worshippers in the mosque. An adjacent shophouse was converted into a madrasa and a prayer hall for women in 1998.

Masjid Al-Abrar was designated a national monument on 19 November 1974.  The mosque is currently administered by the Islamic Religious Council of Singapore.

Architecture
The design of the building is based on Indo-Islamic architecture with two tall minarets at the front.

The building was built along a row of shophouses, and the frontage incorporated a five-foot way (1.524 m) that connects the walkway of the other shophouses.

Transportation
The mosque is accessible within walking distance from Telok Ayer MRT station.

See also
 Islam in Singapore
 List of mosques in Singapore

References

National Heritage Board (2002), Singapore's 100 Historic Places, Archipelago Press,

External links

National Heritage Board website
Majlis Ugama Islam Singapura, MUIS (Islamic Religious Council of Singapore)
List of Mosques in Singapore managed by MUIS : Masjid Al-Abrar (Koochoo Pally)

Religious buildings and structures completed in 1855
19th-century mosques
Abrar
Tourist attractions in Singapore
National monuments of Singapore
Chinatown, Singapore
Outram, Singapore
Indian diaspora in Singapore
19th-century architecture in Singapore